Suzanne Blanc (1915 − October 5, 1999) was an American mystery writer who won an Edgar Allan Poe Award in 1961 and a Grand Prix de Littérature Policière in 1962 for her crime novel The Green Stone. She wrote three other mystery novels and contributed short stories to anthologies and periodicals, including Ellery Queen's Mystery Magazine.

Her novels are set in Mexico and feature characters who suffer from a sense of isolation, according to Jane S. Bakerman in Twentieth Century Crime and Mystery Writers. Bakerman describes Blanc as "a good writer whose canon, though slender, is strong." Of The Green Stone, Kirkus Reviews said, "Atmosphere, incidents and personalities persuasively combined."

Bibliography
 The Green Stone (1961) 
 The Yellow Villa (1964) 
 The Rose Window (1967) 
 The Sea Troll (1969)

References

1915 births
1999 deaths
20th-century American women writers
American mystery writers
Grand Prix de Littérature Policière winners
Edgar Award winners